Herbert Francis Burden (22 March 1898 – 21 July 1915) was a soldier in the British Expeditionary Force during the First World War. Born in 1898 in Lewisham, south-east London, Burden is generally accepted as having lied about his age in order to enlist at the age of 16. Having joined the 1st South Northumberland Fusiliers, he soon deserted, returned to London and joined the East Surrey Regiment, whom he also soon deserted. Rejoining his old battalion, he was sent to France when the army believed him to be 19 years old, and he probably fought at the Battle of Bellewaarde Ridge in May 1915. Having already gone absent without leave (AWOL) from his unit on multiple occasions, he left his post once again the following month—he said to see a friend in the neighbouring regiment—but he was arrested and accused of desertion. Found guilty, he was executed by firing squad two days later aged 17. In 2001 his case, and his image, was the basis for a memorial statue in the National Memorial Arboretum to those who had been unfairly executed by 20th-century standards. Five years later, Burden and the other men were granted pardons by the British government.

Early life
Herbert Burden was born on 22 March 1898, in Silvermere Road, Lewisham, the son of Arthur John Burden of Catford, a gardener, and Charlotte Mary, née Donaldson. Before the war Burden appears to have been employed as a carman, a form of delivery driver, possibly on the docks.

Question of wartime identity
Precisely establishing Burden's identity has proved somewhat problematic for historians. Service records for a Herbert Francis Burden of the Northumberland Fusiliers have never been found. A large number of records of servicemen from the First World War were lost during the 1940 Blitz of the Second World War, and it may be that Burden's were lost in this way. However, this individual appears to have enlisted around May 1914, before hostilities had broken out. On the other hand, records of a soldier of another regiment—with exactly the same name—have been found, and it is likely that they are the same man who was executed in June 1915. Confusion has stemmed from the fact that the second Herbert Frances Burden joined up after the war began, on 23 November 1915, at Deptford recruiting office. He joined the East Surrey Regiment and was given service number 3832.

Burden lied about his age when he enlisted, as he was 16 years old at the time; officially, the minimum age was 19. Then in March the following year—when his records would have shown him to have turned 19, he was transferred to the BEF. Attempting to clarify the confusion between the two possible Burdens, two recent scholars have suggested that the two men who joined both the East Surreys and the Northumberland Fusiliers were the same individual. They have suggested that he joined the Fusiliers in May 1914 ("aged 16 years and two months, but lied about his age, saying he was 18 years and two months old") and soon deserted. He returned to London and then enlisted with the East Surreys in November. He was three weeks into his career with this second regiment, based in Dover Castle barracks, when in December 1914 he deserted again. A Court of Inquiry was there on 11 January 1915 to investigate Burden's absence. It declared that

For some reason, Burden returned to his original regiment. No satisfactory explanation, it has been said, exists as to why Burden "joined the Northumberland Fusiliers, deserted, joined another battalion and deserted yet again".

Military career
 
It was with the South Northumberland Fusiliers that he travelled to France. His battalion arrived in France at the end of March 1915.  Burden fought on the front line for ten months. His battalion fought at the bitterly contested Battle of Hooge in November 1914, in which both the British and German armies had suffered high losses. It is uncertain whether Burden took part. At his later court-martial, it was implied by senior officers that he had not, and that, indeed, that the only action he had seen was "the usual trench sniping" and a couple of patrols only.
During this period, he breached the army's disciplinary code on multiple occasions, which included unauthorised absences. However, at some point he won a medal because it was subsequently forfeited by his conviction for desertion, a detail noted as such in the Medal Roll of the Northumberland Fusiliers.

Burden was still on the Ypres Salient in May 1915 and seems to have played some part in the assault on Bellewaarde Ridge. This battle, part of the Second Battle of Ypres was fought from 24 to 25 May. It saw bitter fighting during which the German Army launched the biggest gas attack yet seen in the war.

Desertion
Burden by now had "undergone the usual nerve-shattering baptism of shelling in the trenches", and having seen friends killed at the Battle of Belwaarde Ridge, was sent to a military hospital. Discharged 
on the afternoon of 26 June he was with his battalion when they received orders to head towards the front line, where it was detailed to dig trenches. Shortly after this order was received, Burden left his post. He was spotted with the neighbouring Royal West Kent Regiment the following day. Burden later explained that he had gone there to comfort a colleague whom he said he had served with, in 1913. Burden said that he had "heard that he had lost a brother [and] I wanted to find out if it were true or not". This could very well have been the case, as the West Kent Regiment had recruited heavily from Burden's home area around Lewisham and Catford. Burden was arrested on 28 June.

Court-martial and execution

Within two days of his capture, Burden was court martialled and found guilty of desertion. His sentence was confirmed by the commander of the British Second Army, General Sir Herbert Plumer. He was shot on 21 July 1915, at the age of 17. He was the youngest soldier to be executed by the British Army, although his age was never questioned during the proceedings, and Burden did not raise it himself. Discipline, though, "was still being applied to the standards of the pre-war regular army": every officer who had subsequently to voice an opinion, as part of the confirmatory process, on the merits or otherwise of Burden's death sentence opted to uphold it.

A number of factors have been subsequently raised in mitigation of Burden's circumstance: "his age, the alleged impact of the casualties suffered by his battalion at Bellewaarde Ridge, the fact that he had no defence at his trial as all who could speak for him were killed, and that his absence had been a classic case of AWOL, not desertion". Yet his unsatisfactory record in his few months of active service undoubtedly told against him; "unfortunately, Pte Burden had a bad record". This included at least seven cases of AWOL, in both England and France, and various other disciplinary offences. He also compounded his situation on at least one occasion by going sick the day after being meted out a punishment. 
In August 1915 the local Catford Journal newspaper reported him as being among nine local men who had recently been killed in action. Burden's name appeared on the roll of honour that was created after the war for St Lawrence's Church, Catford, although he does not appear on the war memorial subsequently erected within the church. Burden is listed on Addenda Panel 60 of the Menin Gate Memorial in Ypres.

Memorialised

The National Memorial Arboretum in Staffordshire houses a memorial to executed soldiers from the First World War. It consists of a  statue, created by Andy de Comyn, surrounded by 306 short stakes to represent the number of executed men. The statue itself is based on Burden as he may have stood at the execution post: "bare-headed. blindfolded, a disc pinned over his heart and hands tied behind his back", and the stakes represent those that the condemned man was tied to before being shot. Six trees in front of the statue symbolise the assembled firing squad. The statue was erected at the Arboretum on the 85th anniversary of Burden's execution. It was designed to "represent all those British and Commonwealth soldiers executed for desertion in the First World War". 

In 2006 the Secretary of State for Defence, Des Browne, announced that Herbert Burden would receive a parliamentary pardon from the British government, along with over 300 others who had also been executed for various offences—excluding murder—during the war. This was granted after a campaign to recognise that, the Director of the Arboretum said, "over 80 years of medical, psychological, psychiatric and sociological advances gives us advantages denied those who sat on the court-martial boards that passed sentence", and that they were almost certainly suffering from post-traumatic stress disorder, "or shell shock as it was known in 1916". On the other hand, for instance, military historian Correlli Barnett has described posthumous pardons such as these as being "pointless", as the moral compass of late-twentieth-century commentators was fundamentally different from that of officers at the front at the time who had "a different moral perspective". Such opposing views have been described as "part and parcel of the nationwide debate on the workings of military law during the Great War and the legitimacy of the demands for a posthumous public exoneration of the condemned soldiers".

Notes

References

Bibliography 

 
 
 
 
 
 
 
 
 
 
 
 
 
 
 
 
 

1898 births
1915 deaths
1915 crimes in Europe
Royal Northumberland Fusiliers soldiers
British Army personnel executed during World War I
British Army personnel of World War I
British Army personnel who were court-martialled
People from Lewisham
Executed people from London
Deaths by firearm in Belgium
People executed for desertion
Child soldiers in World War I
Military personnel from London